is the 5th single by Japanese idol group Hinatazaka46. It was released on May 26, 2021, through Sony Music Entertainment Japan. The title track featured Shiho Katō as center, which is her first appearance in the position on a single.

Production and release 
The single was released in five versions: Type-A, Type-B, Type-C, Type-D, and a regular edition. All versions except for the regular edition also includes a Blu-ray Disc containing music videos and short videos featuring each member individually.

Shiho Katō was chosen for the first time as the center (lead performer) position of the title track. It was also her first center role after Hinatazaka46's rebranding in 2019, as her previous one was during their time as Hiragana Keyakizaka46 for "Happy Aura", a B-side in the Keyakizaka46 single "Ambivalent".

"Koe no Ashiato" is used as the theme song to the television series Koeharu!, which casts members of Hinatazaka46.

Track listing 
All lyrics written by Yasushi Akimoto.

Type-A

Type-B

Type-C

Type-D

Regular Edition

Participating members

"Kimi Shika Katan" 
Center: Shiho Katō

 1st row: Hina Kawata, Miku Kanemura, Shiho Katō, Nao Kosaka, Akari Nibu
 2nd row: Mei Higashimura, Hinano Kamimura, Ayaka Takamoto, Kyōko Saitō, Mirei Sasaki, Hiyori Hamagishi, Miho Watanabe
 3rd row: Suzuka Tomita, Mikuni Takahashi, Mana Takase, Haruyo Yamaguchi, Konoka Matsuda, Yūka Kageyama, Marī Morimoto, Manamo Miyata, Sarina Ushio, Kumi Sasaki

"Koe no Ashiato" 
Two Center: Mirei Sasaki, Akari Nibu

 1st row: Shiho Katō, Hina Kawata, Akari Nibu, Mirei Sasaki, Miku Kanemura, Nao Kosaka 
 2nd row: Kyōko Saitō, Sarina Ushio, Hinano Kamimura, Miho Watanabe, Ayaka Takamoto, Konoka Matsuda, Suzuka Tomita
 3rd row: Mikuni Takahashi, Marī Morimoto, Haruyo Yamaguchi, Hiyori Hamagishi, Mei Higashimura, Kumi Sasaki, Manamo Miyata, Mana Takase, Yūka Kageyama

"Nageki no Delete" 
 Shiho Katō（Solo Songs）

"Right?" 
 Marī Morimoto, Haruyo Yamaguchi, Hinano Kamimura, Mikuni Takahashi（3rd Generation Songs）

"Dōsuru? Dōsuru? Dōsuru?" 
Center: Mei Higashimura

 1st row: Ayaka Takamoto, Mei Higashimura, Kyōko Saitō
 2nd row: Mana Takase, Shiho Katō, Sarina Ushio, Mirei Sasaki, Kumi Sasaki, Yūka Kageyama（1st Generation Songs）

"Sekai ni wa Thank you! ga Afurete Iru" 
Center: Nao Kosaka

 1st row: Miku Kanemura, Nao Kosaka, Miho Watanabe
 2nd row: Hiyori Hamagishi, Suzuka Tomita, Hina Kawata, Akari Nibu, Konoka Matsuda, Manamo Miyata（2nd Generation Songs）

"Bōdai na Yume ni Oshi Tsubusarete" 
Center: Shiho Katō

 1st row: Hina Kawata, Miku Kanemura, Shiho Katō, Nao Kosaka, Akari Nibu
 2nd row: Mei Higashimura, Hinano Kamimura, Ayaka Takamoto, Kyōko Saitō, Mirei Sasaki, Hiyori Hamagishi, Miho Watanabe
 3rd row: Suzuka Tomita, Mikuni Takahashi, Mana Takase, Haruyo Yamaguchi, Konoka Matsuda, Yūka Kageyama, Marī Morimoto, Manamo Miyata, Sarina Ushio, Kumi Sasaki

Charts

Weekly charts

Year-end charts

References 

2021 singles
2021 songs
Hinatazaka46 songs
Songs with lyrics by Yasushi Akimoto
Sony Music Entertainment Japan singles
Oricon Weekly number-one singles